is a train station in Yoshino, Yoshino District, Nara Prefecture, Japan.

Lines 
 Kintetsu Railway
 Yoshino Line

Platforms and tracks

Surrounding Area

External links
 

Railway stations in Japan opened in 1928
Railway stations in Nara Prefecture